South Manistique Lake is a  lake in Mackinac County, in the Upper Peninsula of the U.S. state of Michigan.

Homeowners and visitors are served by the unincorporated community of Curtis, Michigan, located on an isthmus that divides South Manistique Lake from Big Manistique Lake directly to the north.

A  spit of glacial gravel, left behind by some long-forgotten Ice Age glacier, projects from South Manistique Lake's western shore out into the lake.  Not surprisingly, it is called "Long Point."  An islet, Norton Island, can be seen near the lake's southeastern shore.

As with other Upper Peninsula lakes, South Manistique Lake is known for its fishing. Local guides point fisherfolk toward muskie, smallmouth bass, and the lake's self-sustaining population of walleye.

See also
List of lakes in Michigan

References

Lakes of Michigan
Bodies of water of Mackinac County, Michigan